Euphyciodes is a genus of moths of the family Crambidae.

Species
Euphyciodes albotessulalis (Mabille, 1900)
Euphyciodes griveaudalis Viette, 1960

References
afromoths

Pyraustinae
Crambidae genera